Saimon Pains Tormen (born 3 March 1991), or simply Saimon, is a Brazilian professional footballer who plays as a centre back for Londrina.

Career
On 5 February 2009, Saimon debuted for Grêmio in a 3-1 away loss against Veranópolis, at Campeonato Gaúcho.

Career statistics

Honours

Club
Grêmio
Campeonato Brasileiro Sub-20: 2009
Campeonato Gaúcho: 2010

International
Brazil U20
South American Youth Championship: 2011

References

External links
 Saimon profile. Portal Oficial do Grêmio.
 

1991 births
Living people
Brazilian footballers
Association football defenders
Campeonato Brasileiro Série A players
Grêmio Foot-Ball Porto Alegrense players
Esporte Clube Vitória players
Figueirense FC players
Brazil youth international footballers
People from Erechim
Sportspeople from Rio Grande do Sul